Negit Island is an island in Mono Lake. Negit (along with nearby Paoha Island) is a volcanic cone less than 2000 years old. It can be considered to be the northernmost of the Mono Craters. Negit is composed of three dark dacite lava flows.

Negit is an important nesting ground for migratory birds, including the California gull, which can often be seen wheeling in the air above Mono Lake. The fall of the lake level since 1941 created a land bridge to the island. The land bridge permitted predators, such as coyotes, to raid the bird eggs of the island. However, since 1994, the lake level has been permitted to rise and the land bridge is currently submerged.

Negit Island is accessible by boats (commonly kayaks). However, the island is off-limits from April 1 through August 1, to protect the nesting gulls.

See also

 Mono Lake Tufa State Reserve
 Mono Basin National Scenic Area
 List of islands of California

Lake islands of California
Islands of Mono County, California
Islands of Northern California
Inyo National Forest
Landforms of the Sierra Nevada (United States)
Uninhabited islands of California